Deirdre Osborne is an Australian-born academic who is Reader in English Literature and Drama in the Theatre and Performance Department at Goldsmiths, University of London, and also co-convenes the MA degree in Black British Writing.

Career
Deirdre Osborne studied at the University of Melbourne, Australia, earning a Classics degree, English Literature at King's College London, and did a research PhD in Victorian literature (for which she was Australian Bicentennial Scholar) from Birkbeck, University of London, where she also taught.

She is currently Reader in English Literature and Drama in the Theatre and Performance Department at Goldsmiths, University of London, and with Professor Joan Anim-Addo co-convenes the MA in Black British Writing, a ground-breaking course that is taught nowhere else.

She wrote the Edexcel Examination Board's A-level Black British Literature syllabus.

She has published extensively on the work of Black British writers (including Kwame Kwei-Armah, Roy Williams, Lemn Sissay, SuAndi, debbie tucker green, Andrea Levy, Valerie Mason-John and Mojisola Adebayo). Her books include Critically Black: Black British Dramatists and Theatre in the New Millennium (2016), Inheritors of the Diaspora: Contemporary Black British Poetry, Drama and Prose (2016), Bringing up baby: food, nurture and childrearing in late-Victorian literature (2016) and, as editor, The Cambridge Companion to British Black and Asian Literature, the first comprehensive account of the influence of contemporary British Black and Asian writing in British culture, which "investigates the past sixty-five years of literature by centralising the work of British Black and Asian writers".

Osborne was responsible for organising two notable international conferences at Goldsmiths: "On Whose Terms?": Critical Negotiations in Black British Literature and the Arts, in 2008, and On Whose Terms? Ten Years On… (2018).

In 2021, with Joan Anim-Addo and Kadija Sesay she curated This is The Canon: Decolonize Your Bookshelf in 50 Books – in the words of Nikesh Shukla "a vital and timely introduction to some of the best books I've ever read" – which is described as "[s]ubverting the reading lists that have long defined Western cultural life", highlighting alternatives by people of African or Asian descent and indigenous peoples.

Selected bibliography
 2016. Critically Black: Black British Dramatists and Theatre in the New Millennium. University of Manchester Press.
 2016. Inheritors of the Diaspora: Contemporary Black British Poetry, Drama and Prose. London: Northcote Press.
 2016. Bringing up baby: food, nurture and childrearing in late-Victorian literature. 
 2021. (With Kadija Sesay and Joan Anim-Addo) This is the Canon: Decolonize Your Bookshelves in 50 Books. London: Greenfinch/Quercus. .

As editor
 2008. Hidden Gems. London: Oberon Books. 
 2011. A Raisin in the Sun. London: Methuen Drama. 
 2011. A Raisin in the Sun [Critical Edition]. London: Methuen Drama. 
 2012. Hidden Gems Two: Contemporary Black British Plays: 2. London: Oberon Books. 
 2014. (With Brewer, Mary F. and Lynette Goddard) Modern and Contemporary Black British Drama. London and New York: Palgrave Macmillan. 
 2016. Contemporary Black British Women's Writing: Contradictions and Heritages.
 2016. The Cambridge Companion to British Black and Asian Literature (1945–2010). Cambridge and New York: Cambridge University Press. .

References

External links
 "Dr Deirdre Osborne", Goldsmiths, University of London.
 "Deirdre Osborne on The Cambridge Companion to British Black and Asian Literature (1945-2010)", Cambridge University Press, 13 February 2017. YouTube video.
 Deirdre Osborne at Black British Women Writers.

Academics of Goldsmiths, University of London
Alumni of Birkbeck, University of London
Alumni of King's College London
Australian academics
Australian women academics
Living people
University of Melbourne alumni
Year of birth missing (living people)